is a female marathon runner from Japan, who won the Nagoya Marathon on March 11, 2001 in a personal best time of 2:26:01 hours after having triumphed in the Berlin Marathon seven months earlier. She finished ninth at the 2001 World Championships in Athletics.

Achievements

References

External links

1974 births
Living people
Sportspeople from Kobe
Japanese female long-distance runners
Japanese female marathon runners
World Athletics Championships athletes for Japan
Japan Championships in Athletics winners
Berlin Marathon female winners